Androsace occidentalis is a species of flowering plant in the primrose family known by the common name western rockjasmine.

It is native to much of southern central and western Canada, and the midwestern and western United States, from the Great Lakes region south to Texas, and west across the Great Plains to Idaho, Utah, and the Sierra Nevada in California.

It occurs in open habitat such as prairies and meadows in montane forests, especially in moist areas.

Description
Androsace occidentalis is a diminutive annual herb reaching a maximum height of about 7 centimeters. It grows from a basal rosette of oblong hairy leaves no more than one or two centimeters long.

It produces an erect inflorescence which is an umbel atop a thin, naked peduncle. The umbel is composed of 5 to 10 tiny flowers, each on a pedicel up to 3 centimeters long. The flowers have a white or pinkish five-lobed corolla inside a cup of pointed reddish sepals.

External links
Calflora Database: Androsace occidentalis (Western rockjasmine)
USGS NPWRC Herbarium profile of Androsace occidentalis
Kansas Wildflowers: Western rockjasmine

occidentalis
Flora of Canada
Flora of the Western United States
Flora of the North-Central United States
Flora of the United States
Flora of the South-Central United States
Flora of the Great Lakes region (North America)
Flora of the Great Plains (North America)
Flora of California
Plants described in 1813
Flora without expected TNC conservation status